Aristolochia serpentaria is a species of perennial flowering plant in the Aristolochiaceae (birthwort) family. The species is commonly known as Virginia snakeroot and is native to eastern North America, from Connecticut to southern Michigan and south to Texas and Florida.

Description and Ecology
They have pipe-shaped flowers and heart-shaped leaves.  It is a larval host to the pipevine swallowtail and the polydamas swallowtail.

Protection
Virginia snakeroot is considered an endangered species in New York, where no reports of the species were made for the century between 1895 and 1994, when it was rediscovered in the Hudson Highlands. Since then, other scattered populations have been observed in the state.

The plant is also rare in Connecticut, where it is on that state's list of species of special concern.  In Michigan, its status is "Threatened."

References

serpentaria
Flora of the Eastern United States
Plants described in 1753
Taxa named by Carl Linnaeus